Pagida is a genus of crab spiders in the family Thomisidae, containing only three species.

Species
 Pagida minuta Benjamin & Clayton, 2016 — Borneo
 Pagida pseudorchestes (Thorell, 1890) — Sumatra
 Pagida salticiformis (O. P.-Cambridge, 1883) — Sri Lanka

References

Thomisidae
Araneomorphae genera
Spiders of Asia